The Ireland national baseball team has been in existence since 1996 and has taken part in several major baseball tournaments and tours. As in many other sports in Ireland, the team represents both the Republic of Ireland and Northern Ireland.

History
The Ireland national baseball team has participated in the following tournaments:

 1996 – European Pool B Championships – Hull, United Kingdom
 1998 – European Pool B Championships – Vienna and Stockerau, Austria
 2000 – European Pool B Championships – Karlovac, Croatia
 2001 – Team tour of New England, United States
 2002 – European Pool B Championships – Stockholm, Sweden
 2004 – European Pool B Championships – Regensberg,Germany
 2005 – Team tour of Orange County area inLos Angeles, United States
 2006 – European Pool B Championships – Antwerp, Belgium
 2008 – European Pool B Championships – Abrantes, Portugal
 2010 – Team tour of New England, United States
 2014 – European Pool C Championships – Ljubljana, Slovenia
 2016 – European Pool C Championships – Ljubljana, Slovenia
 2018 - European Pool C Championships - Ashbourne, County Meath, Ireland
 2019 - European Pool B Championships - Blagoevgrad, Bulgaria

Ireland finished fourth in the 2002 tournament, won a bronze in the 2004 tournament and managed a silver medal in the 2006 tournament, losing to tournament favourites Croatia.  

Ireland won the C pool in 2018, advancing to the B pool of competition in 2019. The competition was played at the International Baseball Centre in County Meath.

Roster
Ireland's roster for the European Baseball Championship Qualifier 2022, the last official competition in which the team took part.

See also
 Baseball in Ireland

References

External links
 Irish National Baseball Team News (archived 2009)

National baseball teams in Europe
 
Baseball